A war wagon is any of several historical types of early fighting vehicle involving an armed or armored animal-drawn cart or wagon.

China
One of the earliest example of using conjoined wagons in warfare as fortification is described in the Chinese historical record Book of Han. During the 119 BC Battle of Mobei of the Han–Xiongnu War, the famous Han general Wei Qing led his army through a fatiguing expeditionary march across the Gobi desert only to find Yizhixie Chanyu's main force waiting to encircle them on the other side.  Using armored heavy wagons known as "Military Sturdy Wagon" (pinyin: wŭ gāng chē) in ring formations as temporary defensive fortifications, Wei Qing neutralised the Xiongnu's initial cavalry charges, forcing a stalemate and buying time for his troops to recover strength, before using the cover of a sandstorm to launch a counteroffensive which overran the nomads.

The Guangwu Emperor (AD 25-57) introduced an ox-pulled war wagon several stories high with an observation tower, which was deployed at the Great Wall against the Xiongnu. By the 6th century such war wagons reached several meters in height and had up to 20 wheels.

Europe

A medieval European war wagon was developed in the Hussite Wars around 1420 by Hussite forces rebelling in Bohemia.  It was a heavy wagon given protective sides with firing slits and heavy firepower from either a cannon or a force of hand-gunners, archers and crossbowmen, supported by infantry using spears, pikes and flails.  Groups of them could form defensive works, but they also were used as hardpoints for formations or as firepower in pincer movements. This early use of gunpowder and innovative tactics helped a largely peasant infantry stave off attacks by the Holy Roman Empire's larger forces of mounted knights.

After the Hussite wars, they stayed in usage as the special tactical weapon of Bohemian mercenaries which prevailed against knights or foot soldiers. Its successful history came to an end, at least for large scale engagements, with the development of field-piece artillery: a battle wagon wall "fortress" of approximately 300 wagons was broken at the Battle of Wenzenbach on September 12, 1504 by the culverines and muskets of the landsknecht regiment of Georg von Frundsberg.

See also

 Armoured car (military)
 Armoured personnel carrier
 Carroballista
 Chariot
 Fire arrow
 Laager, Tabor (formation)
 Tank
 Tachanka
 Wagon
 Wagon train

References

External links
 Hussite War-wagons, presenting detailed information about the Hussites' most characteristic tactic, by Matthew Haywood
 General information regarding the Hussite forces
 Google Books The Hussite Wars 1419-36 by Stephen Turnbull
 Hussite Warwagon painting
 Hussite history summary
 Wargaming Hussite armies and tactics

Armoured fighting vehicles of Germany
Chinese inventions
Czech inventions
Military equipment of antiquity
Military equipment of the Middle Ages
Armoured fighting vehicles of China
Military history of the Czech Republic
Wagons